The 2017 Monster Energy FIM Speedway World Cup Final was the final of the 2017 edition of the Speedway World Cup. It was staged on 8 July at the Alfred Smoczyk Stadium in Leszno, Poland. It was won by Poland, the eighth time they had done so since the World Cup was launched in 2001. They beat Sweden by eight points, while Russia finished third with Great Britain in fourth.

Captain Maciej Janowski was top scorer for Poland, with teammates Bartosz Zmarzlik, Piotr Pawlicki Jr. and Patryk Dudek also all scoring double figures. Antonio Lindbäck lead Sweden to second place, scoring 20 points.

Results

Final

Scores

References

See also 
 2016 Speedway Grand Prix

2016 Speedway World Cup